Madhyakul is a small village in Howrah district, West Bengal, India. It is approximately 7 km from Amta.

Villages in Howrah district